Geroite na Shipka (Geroi Shipki;  in English: Shipka heroes; US title: Heroes of Shipka) is a 1955 Soviet Union/Bulgarian co-production drama film. It tells the story of the famous Battle of Shipka Pass during the Russo-Turkish War of 1877–78. The production companies behind the film are Boyana Film, Bulgar Film and Lenfilm.

The film won the Best Director Award at the 1955 Cannes Film Festival.

Cast
 Ivan Pereverzev as Katorgin
 Viktor Avdyushko as  Osnobishin  
 Georgi Yumatov as  Cossack Sashko Kozir
 Konstantin Sorokin as  Makar Lizyuta
 Petko Karlukovsky as  Borimechkata
 Apostol Karamitev as  Petka
 Anatoli Alekseyev as  Timofei
 Yevgeny Samoylov as  Gen. Skobelev
 Aleksandr Smirnov as Strukov
 Nikolai Massalitinov as  Gorchakov  
 Nikolai Simonov as Otto von Bismarck
 Bruno Freindlich as Gyula Andrássy
 Stefan Pejchev as Panayot
 Zheni Bozhinova as Boyka  
 Katya Chukova as Ionka  
 Vladimir Taskin as Benjamin Disraeli
 Dako Dakovski as Sultan Abdul Hamid II
 Konstantin Kisimov as Suleiman Pasha
 Encho Tagarov as Osman Pasha
 Vladimir Chobur as Stoletov
 Sergei Papov as Iosif Gurko  
 Gancho Ganchev as Dukmasov

Crew
Original Music:
Nikolai Kryukov	 	
Filip Kutev	 	
Cinematography:
Mikhail Kirillov	 	
Film Editing 
Yelena Bazhenova	 	
Production Design
Mikhail Bogdanov	 	
Gennady Myasnikov	 	
Georgi-Dzhon Popov	 	
Costume Design 
Nevena Baltova	 	
Pepa Misirkova	 	
Yevgenia Slovtsova	 	
Makeup 
Vasili Goryunov	
Sound Department
Boris Antonov	
Aleksandr Babij	
Kuzman Shopov

References

External links

1950s war drama films
Films set in 1877
Soviet war drama films
1955 films
Films directed by Sergei Vasilyev
Bulgarian drama films
Russo-Turkish War (1877–1878)
1955 drama films
Battle of Shipka Pass
Soviet epic films